Nathans may refer to:
Nathan's Famous, a restaurant chain
Daniel Nathans, an American microbiologist